Operettenhaus (Stage Operettenhaus) is a performing arts theatre in Hamburg, owned and operated by Stage Entertainment.

History 
In 1986, the theatre, leased by Stella Entertainment, opened with the Andrew Lloyed Webber musical Cats. In 2001 Stage Entertainment acquired 50% of the operation/lease of the theatre. After the bankruptcy of Stella in 2002, Stage Entertainment acquired several assets including the remaining shares of the lease of the Operettenhaus. Stage Entertainment acquired the theatre in 2011 from the city of Hamburg.

Productions

References

External links
 Stage Operettenhaus
 Stage Entertainment Corporate

Theatres in Hamburg
Buildings and structures in Hamburg-Mitte